Send in the Clones may refer to:

"Send in the Clones", an episode of The Adventures of Jimmy Neutron, Boy Genius
"Send in the Clones" (DuckTales episode), an episode of DuckTales
"Send in the Clones", an episode of Johnny Bravo
"Send in the Clones" (The Simpsons), a segment of the episode "Treehouse of Horror XIII"
"Send in the Clones", an episode of the 6th season of Xena: Warrior Princess
Send in the Clones, an adventure for the Paranoia role-playing game
"Send in the Clones", a parody of the Judy Collins song "Send In the Clowns", written and performed by Phish

See also
Send In the Clowns (disambiguation)